Sir Edward Stanislaus Bulfin  (6 November 1862 − 20 August 1939) was a British general during World War I, where he established a reputation as an excellent commander at the brigade, divisional and corps levels. He was most noted for his actions during the First Battle of Ypres, when he organized impromptu forces to slow down the German assault.

In 1917–18 he commanded XXI Corps in the Sinai and Palestine campaign.

Early life
Bulfin was born Woodtown Park, Rathfarnham, Co Dublin the second son of Patrick Bulfin and Teresa Clare Carroll. His father was a son of Edward Bulfin from Derrinlough, King's County (now County Offaly), and was elected Lord Mayor of Dublin in 1870. He was educated at Stonyhurst College, and then at Kensington Catholic Public School Although he attended Trinity College, Dublin, he did not take a degree, choosing a military career instead.

Military career
From Dublin University he entered the Armagh Militia from where he was commissioned into the Princess of Wales's Own (Yorkshire Regiment) in 1884, following militia service with the Royal Irish Fusiliers. He was dispatched to India on 31 December 1889, and first saw active service in Burma in that year. He was promoted to captain on 30 January 1895. In 1898 he was appointed Garrison Adjutant at Dover, and in November embarked for South Africa with his fellow Irishman General Sir William Butler, as Assistant Military Secretary.
When the Second Boer War broke out, in 1899 he was appointed brigade major to the 9th Brigade. He saw action at several skirmishes in South Africa, and was promoted to a brevet major in November 1900. He was present at several battles including Belmont and Graspan, Modder River, Magersfontein, Rhenoster and Lindley. 
On his return to England he received a brevet promotion to lieutenant-colonel in the South Africa honours list published on 26 June 1902, and abandoned regimental soldiering in favour of a staff career. From October 1902 to 1904, he served as deputy assistant adjutant-general with the 2nd Division, 1st Army Corps, and on 28 November 1903 he received the substantive rank of major. From 1906 to 1910 he served as assistant adjutant and quartermaster-general for Cape Colony. After returning to England, he was promoted to colonel and given command of the Essex Brigade, an unusual appointment as Bulfin had never commanded a battalion. In 1913, he was promoted again, and appointed to the prestigious command of the 2nd Infantry Brigade.

From 1914 to 1939 he was Regimental Colonel of Alexandra, Princess of Wales's Own (Yorkshire Regiment).

World War I
At the outbreak of World War I Bulfin and the 2nd Brigade were transported to the Western Front as part of the original British Expeditionary Force. During the fighting around Ypres at the end of October 1914, he organized an impromptu force of six battalions (known as "Bulfin's force") and led a counterattack to stem the German advance. This action won him considerable praise from 1st Corps commander Douglas Haig, as well as BEF commander John French. In December, he was promoted to command the newly formed 28th Division, and led this formation through the heavy German gas attacks at the 2nd Battle of Ypres, and also at the Battle of Loos.

Bulfin fell ill in October 1915, and spent the first half of 1916 recuperating in England, thus avoiding a transfer to Salonika. He returned to the Western Front in June 1916 to command the 60th Division during the Battle of the Somme, although the division did not play a significant role in the offensive.

Salonika and Palestine

In December 1916, 60th Division was transferred to Salonika, although they remained for only six months and took part in no serious fighting. Moving to Palestine in June 1917, Bulfin was promoted to lieutenant-general and given command of XXI Corps. He proved a capable corps commander, leading his formation through Ottoman defenses at the Third Battle of Gaza, opening the way for the capture of Jerusalem. He later commanded the corps in the overwhelming victory at the Battle of Megiddo in the waning days of the war.

Post war
After the armistice, Bulfin remained in the army in a variety of staff positions, gaining a promotion to full general in 1925 and finally retiring in 1926. His first position was to remain in the Middle East and Egypt in particular. During the Egyptian revolution of 1919 he was known to be a very effective military leader in putting down the unrest especially through organising 'flying columns'. In the summer of 1920 he was offered the job of Chief of Police and Head of Secret Intelligence in Ireland based on his loyalty to the Crown, his Irish origins and his swift handling of the nationalist unrest in Egypt in 1919. Bulfin refused the appointment on the grounds that as a Catholic and an Irishman it would be distasteful to him to do any work which was not of a purely military character. He died in 1939 at his home in Boscombe, Bournemouth, Dorset.

Family
He married Mary Frances Lonergan in 1898 (immediately prior to posting to South Africa), with whom he had two children.

Arms

References

External links

Edward Bulfin at First World War.com
Edward Bulfin at the Birmingham Centre for First World War Studies
Dictionary of National Biography online edition, accessed 19 Aug 2007
Colour stamp of Edward Bulfin, 1920s

|-

British Army generals
Military personnel from County Dublin
British Army generals of World War I
British Army personnel of the Second Boer War
Knights Commander of the Order of the Bath
Commanders of the Royal Victorian Order
People educated at Stonyhurst College
People from Boscombe
People from Rathfarnham
1862 births
1939 deaths
Green Howards officers
Royal Irish Fusiliers officers
Knights of the Holy Sepulchre